Great Mosque of al-Nuri may refer to:

 Great Mosque of al-Nuri (Homs), Syria
 Great Mosque of al-Nuri (Mosul), Iraq